Percival Edward Wilson (31 March 1889 – 28 March 1941) was an Australian rules footballer who played with Collingwood and Melbourne in the Victorian Football League (VFL) during the early 1900s.

A rover, Wilson won two premierships with Collingwood. The latter, in 1917, was a captain. In 1921 he moved to the Demons where he became captain and coach of the club.

Wilson coached Camberwell in 1930–31.

Death
Having been ill for several months, he died on 28 March 1941.

Footnotes

References
 'Fairplay', "Ornament to the Game: Percy Wilson's Great Record", The Sporting Globe, (Saturday, 7 July 1928), p.6.

External links

 Percy Wilson, Demonwiki.
 Percy Wilson, The VFA Project.
 Percy Wilson, Boyles Football Photos.
 Percy Wilson, Collingwood Forever.

1889 births
1941 deaths
Australian rules footballers from Melbourne
Australian Rules footballers: place kick exponents
Melbourne Football Club players
Melbourne Football Club captains
Melbourne Football Club coaches
Collingwood Football Club players
Collingwood Football Club Premiership players
Port Melbourne Football Club coaches
Camberwell Football Club coaches
Two-time VFL/AFL Premiership players
People from Carlton North, Victoria